Faraz Dero is a Pakistani politician who is the current Provincial Minister of Sindh for Auqaf, Religious Affairs, and Zakat and Ushr, in office since 5 September 2018. He has been a member of the Provincial Assembly of Sindh since August 2018. Previously he was a Member of the Provincial Assembly of Sindh from May 2013 to May 2018.

Early life and education 
He was born on 2 April 1980 in Tando Adam Khan.

He has received matriculation level education from Lawrence College, Ghora Gali.

Political career

He was elected to the Provincial Assembly of Sindh as a candidate of Pakistan Peoples Party (PPP) from Constituency PS-82 (Sanghar-V) in 2013 Pakistani general election.

He was re-elected to Provincial Assembly of Sindh as a candidate of PPP from Constituency PS-44 (Sanghar-IV) in 2018 Pakistani general election.

On 5 September 2018, he was inducted into the provincial Sindh cabinet of Chief Minister Syed Murad Ali Shah and was appointed as Provincial Minister of Sindh for Auqaf with the additional ministerial portfolios of religious affairs, and Zakat and Ushr.

References

Living people
Sindh MPAs 2013–2018
1980 births
Pakistan People's Party MPAs (Sindh)
Sindh MPAs 2018–2023